Helen M. French (1832–1909) was an American educator who served as the fifth president (referred to at that time as "principal") of Mount Holyoke College (then Mount Holyoke Female Seminary)  from 1867 to 1872. She graduated from Mount Holyoke in 1857 and taught there for ten years before becoming principal.

See also
Presidents of Mount Holyoke College

References

External links
Biography 

Mount Holyoke College alumni
Mount Holyoke College faculty
Presidents and Principals of Mount Holyoke College
1832 births
1909 deaths